Idaho Building may refer to:

Idaho Building (Chicago World's Fair), at the 1893 exposition in Chicago, Illinois
Idaho Building (Boise, Idaho), listed on the National Register of Historic Places (NRHP)
Idaho Building (1904) at the 1904 Louisiana Purchase Exposition in St. Louis, Missouri
Idaho Building (1905) at the 1905 Lewis and Clark Centennial Exposition in Portland, Oregon